USS PCS-1425 was a United States Navy minesweeper and patrol ship in service during World War II. Her keel was laid in 1943 as PC-1425, before being reclassified three months later as a "patrol craft sweeper" (PCS). After the war, the ship served as a test platform for the development of naval radios, being the first ship to demonstrate the use of an automatically aligning UHF directional antenna.

In 1950, she was leased to the Puget Sound Naval Academy for use as a training ship.

References

External links 
 Photo gallery on navsource.org

Ships built in Kingston, New York
World War II patrol vessels of the United States
PCS-1376-class minesweepers
1943 ships
World War II minesweepers of the United States
Training ships